Callinicus or Kallinikos is a surname or male given name; the feminine form is Kalliniki, Callinice or Callinica. It is of Greek origin, meaning "beautiful victor".

People named Callinicus

Seleucid rulers
Seleucus II Callinicus (r. 246–225 BC)
Antiochus VIII Grypus
Antiochus XII Dionysus
Antiochus XIII Asiaticus

Kingdom of Commagene
King Mithridates I Callinicus, who married the daughter of Antiochus VIII Grypus
Callinicus (Prince of Commagene), a prince of Commagene who lived in the 1st century

Religious figures
 Callinicus, the supposed father of the tannaic scholar Onkelos
 Callinicus of Pelusium, a 4th-century bishop, imprisoned by Saint Athanasius of Alexandria
 Martyrs of the Eastern Church:
  (c. 2nd century), martyred together with Meletius Stratelates and many others
  (d. 251), martyred together with Leukios and Saint Thyrsus
 Saint Callinica (or Callinicus), beheaded in Rome in 252
  (c. 4th century), martyred in Gangra (modern Çankırı)
 Patriarch Callinicus I of Constantinople (r. 693–705), a saint of the Eastern Orthodox Church
 Patriarch Callinicus II of Constantinople (r. 1688, 1689–1693, 1694–1702)
 Patriarch Callinicus III of Constantinople (r. 1726), died before being enthroned and sometimes not counted among the patriarchs
 Patriarch Callinicus IV of Constantinople (or III) (r. 1757), numbered III when the previous patriarch is not counted
 Patriarch Callinicus V of Constantinople (or IV) (r. 1801–1806, 1808–1809)
 Serbian Patriarch Kalinik I (r. 1691–1710)
 Serbian Patriarch Kalinik II (r. 1765–1766)
Patriarch Callinicus of Alexandria (r. 1858–1861)

Other historical figures
Callinicus (Sophist) (c. 3rd century), Greek historian
 , praepositus sacri cubiculi (chamberlain) and sole witness of the death of Byzantine emperor Justinian I in 565, who designated Justin II as successor
Callinicus (exarch), Exarch of Ravenna (r. 597–602 or 603)
Callinicus of Heliopolis (c. 7th century), Byzantine Lebanese chemist credited with inventing Greek fire

Modern individuals
 Jannis Kallinikos (b. 1954), organization theorist at the London School of Economics
 Alex Callinicos (b. 1950), political theorist at King's College London and Trotskyite leader

Places
 Callinicum, a city founded by Seleucus II Callinicus, now modern Raqqa, Syria
 Battle of Callinicum (531), victory of the Sassanid Persians over the Byzantines